The Nanjing Dinghuaimen Yangtze River Tunnel, formerly Nanjing Yangzijiang Tunnel, is a set of two tunnels under the Yangtze River in Nanjing, China. The tunnel connects the Gulou District to Jiangbei New District in the city of Nanjing. Construction of the tunnels began in 2010. The tunnel broke through in 2015 and was opened in 1 Jan 2016. The tunnel has renamed on 20 December 2019.

See also
 Yangtze River bridges and tunnels

References

Road tunnels in China
Transport in Jiangsu
Tunnels completed in 2016